Dorothy Dorow (22 August 1930 - 15 April 2017) was an English soprano, mostly active in the contemporary vocal music field.

She debuted in her birthplace London in 1958. She has sung world-premieres of works by such composers as György Ligeti, Hans Werner Henze, Luigi Dallapiccola, Sylvano Bussotti and Luigi Nono. Dorow was also particularly noted for her performances of the vocal works of the Second Viennese School, and of Igor Stravinsky. She performed internationally including at the Kraków Philharmonic.She won the Edison Award in 1987 with Rudolf Jansen (piano). After several years of living abroad (including the Netherlands) she retired in 1992 to Duloe, Cornwall, where she also died.

Recordings (sel.)
1972  Fartein Valen: Symphonic Poems & Orchestral Songs, Simax 
1975  Dorothy Dorow & Friends: Bell, Musgrave, Maros, Werle, Nørgård, Bäck, Caprice Records (CAP 1059)
1977  Dorothy Dorow & More Friends: Dallapiccola, Tavener, Bedford, Lidholm, Denisov, Naumann, Caprice Records (CAP 1112)
1987 Anton Webern: Lieder, Dorothy Dorow (soprano) and Rudolf Jansen (piano), Etcetera
1988  Franco Donatoni: Spiri; Fili; De Près; etc.,  EtCetera Records 
1988  Arnold Schönberg: Cabaret Songs; Berg: Lieder; Webern: Seven Early Songs, EtCetera Records 
1989  Anton Webern: Complete Vocal Chamber Works, Koch Schwann
1989  Contemporary Music for Soprano and Cello, Dorothy Dorow (soprano) and Aage Kvalbein (cello), Simax 
1995  Dorothy Dorow, Gunilla von Bahr, Lucia Negro, (a coloratura recording), BIS

References

English operatic sopranos
English emigrants to the Netherlands
1930 births
2017 deaths
Place of birth missing
Place of death missing